Phyllis Ellis (born 11 November 1959) is a Canadian writer, actor, director, and producer. Ellis played for the Canadian field hockey team in the 1984 Summer Olympics.

She was formerly married to a former NHL-player Stewart Gavin and has two children.

Awards
Donald Brittain Award for Best Social-Political Documentary 
Gemini for Best Direction 
Gemini nomination for Best Director 
Calgary International Film Festival DGC Best Canadian Documentary Award 2019

Filmography
Ellis has been employed in television and movies for over twenty years writing, acting, directing, and producing. Her credits as a director include:-

Documentaries
About Her, 2010
Painted Land: In Search of the Group of Seven, 2015
Girl's Night Out, 2015
Toxic Beauty, 2019

Acting

Film
It Was You Charlie, 2013

Television
The Wilkinsons, 2006 - 2007
Three Chords from the Truth, 2009
Call Me Fitz, 2010
The Listener, 2011
Murdoch Mysteries, 2011
Lost Girl, 2013

References

External links
 

1959 births
Living people
Canadian female field hockey players
Olympic field hockey players of Canada
Field hockey players at the 1984 Summer Olympics
Sportspeople from Oakville, Ontario
21st-century Canadian screenwriters
Canadian documentary film directors
Canadian film actresses
Canadian documentary film producers
Canadian women film directors
Canadian television directors
Canadian women film producers
Canadian women screenwriters
Canadian women television directors
Canadian women documentary filmmakers